Omar Ismael Montes Moreno (born 22 June 1988) is a Spanish singer and media personality who became known for his appearances in reality shows such as Mujeres y Hombres y Viceversa, Gran Hermano VIP, and Supervivientes, as well as for his relationship with Isa Pantoja (Isabel Pantoja's daughter). As a singer, he has achieved great success with some of his songs, such as "Alocao", "Solo" or "La Rubia (Remix 2)", with which he has achieved several platinum and gold record certifications.

Although the start of his career as a musician was in 2015, he began to be known for his sentimental relationship with Isa Pantoja and his participation in Gran Hermano VIP 6 in 2018. His life took a turn after his participation in Supervivientes 2019, when he became known to the general public.

Biography

Early years and arrival on the television scene 
He was born in the district of Carabanchel in Madrid. He became the Spanish Welterweight boxing champion, with more than 100 fights behind him. His foray into music began in 2015, coinciding with the debut of his first music video, "Mentiras." Years later, he participated on the reality show Gran Hermano VIP 6, where he shared a home with his then-partner, Isa Pantoja, as well as other celebrities such as Mónica Hoyos, Ángel Garó, and El Koala. Omar entered as a reserve in the contest and, after 14 days in the house and a direct nomination for inciting a partner to abuse a contestant, he became the third expelled of the edition.

2018–2019: Supervivientes and first music hits 
After his participation in the Telecinco reality show, Omar's professional career skyrocketed, releasing several singles with other artists, such as: "Así Así" with Alba Dreid, "Fuego" with Moncho Chavea, Denom, Fyahbwoy and Arce, and "Mamá" with Juanjo Sánchez and Daviles de Novelda, among others. In addition, his television career also increased with several interviews on programs such as Sábado Deluxe, Mujeres y Hombres y Viceversa, or Viva la Vida.

In 2019, he participated in the reality show Supervivientes, where he shared editions with his ex-mother-in-law Isabel Pantoja, journalist Chelo GarcÍa Cortés, singers Encarna Salazar and Toñi Salazar, and the presenter Carlos Lozano; in addition, he coincided again with Mónica Hoyos, one of his companions in Gran Hermano Vip 6, among others. Coinciding with his victory in the reality show, he released the remix "La Rubia" with La Nueva Escuela, a song that went platinum and stayed on the charts for several weeks.

With the success of the single "La rubia (Remix 2)" and the imminent release of his first album, "La Vida Mártir", it was announced the release of a song with the singer Bad Gyal called "Alocao", which remained number 1 in the charts for weeks and received four platinum discs. His singles and collaborations after "Alocao" have received great success among the public, especially "Como el agua" with Ana Mena, "Pegamos tela" with Abraham Mateo and Lérica, with a gold record, "Prendío (Remix)" in collaboration with RVFV and Daviles de Novelda, which remained in the charts from January 2020 until March 2020 and went platinum. Or "Más y más" with Ñengo Flow, which in less than 24 hours became the top trend on YouTube Spain.

As for his television career, in addition to participating in two reality-shows on the Mediaset network, he has collaborated on the program Mujeres y Hombres y Viceversa. He has also appeared in several interviews, such as the Christmas Eve special of Mi casa es la tuya with other artists such as Ainhoa Arteta, Santi Millán, or Paz Padilla, presented by Bertín Osborne, in Volverte a Ver, presented by Carlos Sobera, or in a special video of El hormiguero, presented by Pablo Motos.

2020–present: Stability in music 
In 2020, he was nominated for the Odeon Awards in the category "Best Song" with his song "La Rubia (Remix 2)" together with La Nueva Escuela. That same year, after the sustained increase of his cache in recent years, some sources estimated that Montes was earning 160,000 euros per month thanks to events, private parties, and concerts.

In the summer of 2020, he released with Nyno Vargas the song "Hola, Nena", with which he achieved platinum certification, and "Tinder" with Arce. At the end of the same year, it became known that he was the most listened Spanish singer on the Spotify platform.

In 2021, he released the single "Solo" with Ana Mena and Maffio, which became number 1 in YouTube trends in a short time and reached the seventh position in the top songs in Spain. The single was certified double platinum by the Spanish Music Producers. That same year, he participated in the second edition of the contest El Desafío on Antena 3, where he competed with celebrities such as Norma Duval, El Monaguillo, or Jesulín de Ubrique. In May, he released the single "Pa Ti" together with Italian artist Baby K. The song quickly entered the Italian charts at the 95th position. In June, he released the song "No quiero amor" with RVFV, which reached the 24th position in the Spanish music charts. In July, he collaborated with Camela on the single "Vete" and with Fabbio and Lennis Rodríguez in "Diablita remix". In August, he released a collaboration with JC el Diamante titled "Beba que quieres que haga".

In July 2021 Amazon Prime Video announced the development of a documentary series about the singer titled El Principito es Omar Montes for the end of the same year, composed of four episodes with key moments for the artist, remembering from his beginnings in Pan Bendito to his subsequent rise to fame and the management of this, as well as facing his ghosts to find inspiration for his next album. The project was released on November 12 on the platform. In August of the same year, he made his debut as a contributor to the Spanish television program Lazos de sangre. He also joined the remix of the song "Diablita" by Fabio Colloricchio, with which he obtained platinum certification and he also released the single "Beba que quieres que haga", with which he obtained another gold record certification.

He debuted as a runway model for Mercedes-Benz Fashion Week Madrid in September, working with designer Ágatha Ruiz de la Prada. In addition, his signing as a consultant for the next season of La Voz Senior on Antena 3 was announced, as well as his debut as a presenter for channel Cuatro with the talk show Montes y cía, for which he signed a five-episode contract. In October, he received a nomination for the Los40 Music Awards 2021 in the category of "Artist or group from 40 to 1".

Omar also participated in the seventh edition of the Spanish reality TV show MasterChef Celebrity, with celebrities such as José Mota, Isabel Preysler, Lorenzo Caprile, and Alba Carrillo.

Discography

Studio albums

Singles

Trajectory

Television programs

As collaborator / guest

As a contestant

Television series 
 2019: Una vida de mierda on Mtmad as himself in an episode.

Promotional videos 
 2020: Hormigueddon on Antena 3 (YouTube).
 2021: La clase de recuperación de El internado: Las Cumbres on Prime Video (YouTube).

Awards and nominations

References

1988 births
21st-century Spanish singers
Living people
People from Madrid
Sony Music Spain artists